Harold Elsdale Goad (4 October 1878 – 26 May 1956) was a British writer, journalist and poet. He was an early sympathiser with fascism, publishing the pamphlet What is Fascism?, followed by two books on corporatism.

He was one of those in the British Fascists interested in Fascist ideology, with James Strachey Barnes, in relation to trade unions and guilds. The books were highly regarded by the Italian Fascist government. A small group, briefly attached to Chatham House, studied the Corporate State and included Goad, Barnes, Charles Petrie and Goad's co-author Muriel Currey; Goad addressed a Chatham House meeting in October 1933.

He was Director of the British Institute of Florence from 1922 to 1939.

Works
 - poem

References

 Tamara Colacicco, ‘The British Institutes and the British Council in Fascist Italy: from Harold Goad to Ian Greenlees, 1922-40’, Moder Italy, 23 (3): 315–29.

1878 births
1956 deaths
British fascists
Chatham House people
English writers